Manuel Romay Santiago (born 29 July 1990) is a Spanish professional footballer playing for Deportivo B as a midfielder.

Club career
He commenced his career with Montañeros making 84 appearances between 2009 and 2012. In 2012, he was roped by Deportivo B. Romay said that he was "excited" to play in the team. He made his debut for the club against Celta B.

In June 2014, he signed for Austrian club SC Austria Lustenau. He made his debut against FC Liefering.

References

External links

1990 births
Living people
Association football midfielders
Spanish footballers
People from Bergantiños
Sportspeople from the Province of A Coruña
SC Austria Lustenau players
Segunda División B players
Deportivo Fabril players
Footballers from Galicia (Spain)